The men's 4 × 100 metres relay event at the 2021 European Athletics U23 Championships was held on Day 4 on July 11 at Kadriorg Stadium in Tallinn, Estonia.

Records
Prior to the competition, the records were as follows:

Results

Round 1
Qualification rule:  First 3 in each heat (Q) and the next 2 fastest (q) advance to the Final.

Final

References

Relay 4 x 100
Relays at the European Athletics U23 Championships